Yashwantrao Chavan was the chief minister of Bombay State until its bifurcation into Maharashtra and Gujarat on 1 May 1960. Chavan became the first chief minister of Maharashtra from that day. His government continued till 1962 legislative elections, after which Chavan was sworn in for a second term.

List of ministers
The ministry consisted of 14 cabinet ministers.

References

Indian National Congress
C
C
Cabinets established in 1960
Cabinets disestablished in 1962